Mabel's Latest Prank is a 1914 film both starring and co-directed by Mabel Normand and Mack Sennett.

Cast
Mabel Normand
Mack Sennett
Hank Mann
Slim Summerville

External links
 

1914 films
Silent American comedy films
American black-and-white films
American silent short films
1914 comedy films
1914 short films
American comedy short films
1910s American films